This is a following list of the MTV Movie Award winners and nominees for Best WTF Moment, first awarded in 2009. In 2011, it was renamed Best Jaw-Dropping Moment. In 2012, it was replaced with Best Gut-Wrenching Performance.

Winners and nominees

Best WTF Moment

Best Jaw-Dropping Moment

Best Gut-Wrenching Performance

Notes

References

MTV Movie & TV Awards